Richard Switzer (born August 6, 1995) is an American film producer. He was profiled on Entertainment Tonight at the age of 18 for being the youngest producer in history.

Career
Switzer produced 3 feature films within 18 months of graduating high school, including the Lifetime Television film A Fatal Obsession, Buddy Hutchins starring Jamie Kennedy and Sally Kirkland, and After School Special, featuring Nick Swardson.  He produced and/or executive produced a variety of action and family films including Altitude with Denise Richards and Dolph Lundgren, Isolation with Dominic Purcell and Arlo: The Burping Pig with Drake Bell and Joey Lawrence.

Switzer was an Executive Producer on Tragedy Girls, a comedy-horror film starring Alexandra Shipp, Brianna Hildebrand, Josh Hutcherson, Craig Robinson, and Kevin Durand.  The film premiered at South by Southwest and was released by Gunpowder & Sky. He produced Black Water, an action-thriller film starring Jean-Claude Van Damme and Dolph Lundgren, released by Saban Films in North America, and premiering on 3,000 screens in China, grossing $8 million theatrically.  In 2020, he produced Money Plane starring Edge (wrestler), Kelsey Grammer, Thomas Jane and Denise Richards. 

In 2020, Switzer directed his first movie "Friends Who Kill".

Filmography
 A Fatal Obsession (2014) – Producer
 Buddy Hutchins (2014) – Producer, Joel Hutchins
 School's Out (2015) – Producer, Danny Kent
 The Assault (2015) – Producer
 Isolation (2015) – Executive Producer
 My First Miracle (2015) – Co-Executive Producer
 Emma's Chance (2016) – Executive Producer
 Jack Goes Home (2015) – Co-Executive Producer
 Arlo: The Burping Pig (2016) – Producer
 Altitude (2016) – Producer
 Christmas All Over Again (2016) – Producer
 Tragedy Girls (2017) – Executive Producer
 Black Water (2018) - Producer
 A Dangerous Date (2017) – Producer
 A Mother's Worst Fear (2018) – Producer
 Love on Repeat (2019) – Producer
 In Bed With a Killer (2019) – Producer
 Erasing His Dark Past (2019) – Producer
 The Office Mix-Up (2019) – Producer
 Agent Toby Barks (2020) – Producer
 Final Kill (2020) – Executive Producer
 Friends Who Kill (2020) – Director, Producer
 Killer Competition (2020) – Producer
 Money Plane (2020) – Producer
 Red 48 (2020) – Executive Producer
 Deadly Radio Romance (2020) – Producer
 Fatal Frenemies (2020) – Director, Producer
 The Survivalist (2020) – Executive Producer
 Panama (2020) – Executive Producer
 Sisters for Life (2020) – Producer
 Hostage House (2020) – Producer
 A Stepmother's Secret (2020) – Director, Producer
 High Heat (2020) – Executive Producer

References

External links
 Youtube.com
 M.theday.com
 Nysticriverpress.com
 Westhartfordnews.com

1995 births
Film producers from New York (state)
American financiers
21st-century American male actors
People from Queens, New York
Living people
Male actors from New York City